Prunus brahuica is a species of flowering plant in the Rosaceae family. It is commonly called mashmonk or mazhmonk and ghorghosthai, is a species of wild almond native to Pakistan and Afghanistan. It is a dense, very thorny shrub 1.5 to 2.5m tall, with young twigs that are brownish-red on one side and green on the other. It is morphologically similar to Prunus lycioides, P. spinosissima, P. eburnea and P. erioclada. It can be distinguished from the similar species by having an endocarp with reticulate furrows that are visible on the exterior of the drupe. People in Balochistan apply its gum as a treatment for wounded or infected eyes.

References

brahuica
Flora of Pakistan
Flora of Afghanistan
Plants described in 1888
Medicinal plants
Taxa named by James Edward Tierney Aitchison
Taxa named by Pierre Edmond Boissier
Taxa named by William Hemsley (botanist)